Banyumasan may refer to:

 Banyumasan dialect
 Banyumasan people
 Banyumas Regency